There were two Governments of the 18th Dáil, which was elected at the general election held on 7 April 1965. The 11th Government of Ireland (21 April 1965 – 10 November 1966) was led by Seán Lemass as Taoiseach, while the 12th Government of Ireland (10 November 1966 – 2 July 1969) was led by Jack Lynch as Taoiseach. Both were single-party Fianna Fáil governments, which had been in government since the 1957 election.

The 11th Government lasted for  days and the 12th Government lasted for  days.

11th Government of Ireland

Nomination of Taoiseach
The 18th Dáil first met on 21 April 1965. In the debate on the nomination of Taoiseach, Fianna Fáil leader and outgoing Taoiseach Seán Lemass, Fine Gael leader James Dillon, and Labour Party leader Brendan Corish were each proposed. The nomination of Lemass was carried with 72 votes in favour and 67 votes against. Lemass was re-appointed as Taoiseach by President Éamon de Valera.

Members of the Government
After his appointment as Taoiseach by the president, Seán Lemass proposed the members of the government and they were approved by the Dáil. They were appointed by the president on the same day.

Change to department

Parliamentary Secretaries
On 21 April 1965, the Government appointed the Parliamentary Secretaries on the nomination of the Taoiseach.

Confidence in the government
On 8 July 1966, Labour leader Brendan Corish and Fine Gael leader Liam Cosgrave placed separate motions of no confidence in the government. They were debated as part of the debate on the summer adjournment. The motions were defeated, on votes of 50 to 66 and 54 to 66 respectively.

Resignation
Seán Lemass resigned as Fianna Fáil leader and Jack Lynch won the leadership election to succeed him on 9 November 1966. On the following day, Lemass resigned as Taoiseach.

12th Government of Ireland
The 12th Government was formed by Jack Lynch after the resignation of Seán Lemass.

Nomination of Taoiseach
On 10 November 1966, in the debate on the nomination of Taoiseach, Fianna Fáil leader Jack Lynch, Fine Gael leader Liam Cosgrave, and Labour Party leader Brendan Corish were each proposed. The nomination of Lynch was carried with 71 votes in favour and 64 votes against. Lynch was appointed as Taoiseach by President Éamon de Valera.

Members of the Government
After his appointment as Taoiseach by the president, Seán Lemass proposed the members of the government and they were approved by the Dáil on 16 November 1966. They were appointed by the president on the same day.

Parliamentary Secretaries
On 16 November 1966, the Government appointed the Parliamentary Secretaries on the nomination of the Taoiseach.

Constitutional referendums
The government proposed the Third Amendment of the Constitution Bill 1968, which would have allowed for divergence in the ratio of population to representation across Dáil constituencies, and the Fourth Amendment of the Constitution Bill 1968, which would have altered the electoral system from proportional representation by means of the single transferable vote (PR-STV) to first past the post (FPTP). They were put to referendums on 16 October 1968, and both were defeated by a margin of 39.2% to 60.8%. It was the second time a Fianna Fáil government had proposed to introduce FPTP, with a previous referendum defeated in 1959.

Confidence in the government
On 5 November 1968, Taoiseach Jack Lynch proposed a motion of confidence in the government, which was debated over three days. On 7 November, it was approved on a vote of 68 to 60.

See also
Dáil Éireann
Constitution of Ireland
Politics of the Republic of Ireland

References

Governments of Ireland
1965 establishments in Ireland
1969 disestablishments in Ireland
Cabinets established in 1965
Cabinets disestablished in 1969
18th Dáil